The Ivory Coast MTN Ligue 1 is the top division of the Ivorian Football Federation. It was created in 1960.

2021−22 Ligue 1 clubs
AF Amadou Diallo
AS Indenié Abengourou
ASEC Mimosas
Bouaké FC
CO Korhogo
ES Bafing
FC San Pedro
LYS FC
RC Abidjan
SC Gagnoa
SOA FC
SOL FC
SC d'Adjamé
USC Bassam

Champions

1956: Africa Sports (Before Independence)
1960: Onze Frères de Bassam (1)
1961: Onze Frères de Bassam (2)
1962: Stade d'Abidjan (1)
1963: ASEC Mimosas (1)
1964: Stade d'Abidjan (2)
1965: Stade d'Abidjan (3)
1966: Stade d'Abidjan (4)
1967: Africa Sports (1)
1968: Africa Sports (2)
1969: Stade d'Abidjan (5)
1970: ASEC Mimosas (2)
1971: Africa Sports (3)
1972: ASEC Mimosas (3)
1973: ASEC Mimosas (4)
1974: ASEC Mimosas (5)
1975: ASEC Mimosas (6)
1976: SC Gagnoa (1)
1977: Africa Sports (4)
1978: Africa Sports (5)
1979: Stella Club d'Adjamé (1)
1980: ASEC Mimosas (7)
1981: Stella Club d'Adjamé (2)
1982: Africa Sports (6)
1983: Africa Sports (7)
1984: Stella Club d'Adjamé (3)
1985: Africa Sports (8)
1986: Africa Sports (9)
1987: Africa Sports (10)
1988: Africa Sports (11)
1989: Africa Sports (12)
1990: ASEC Mimosas (8)
1991: ASEC Mimosas (9)
1992: ASEC Mimosas (10)
1993: ASEC Mimosas (11)
1994: ASEC Mimosas (12)
1995: ASEC Mimosas (13)
1996: Africa Sports (13)
1997: ASEC Mimosas (14)
1998: ASEC Mimosas (15)
1999: Africa Sports (14)
2000: ASEC Mimosas (16)
2001: ASEC Mimosas (17)
2002: ASEC Mimosas (18)
2003: ASEC Mimosas (19)
2004: ASEC Mimosas (20)
2005: ASEC Mimosas (21)
2006: ASEC Mimosas (22)
2007: Africa Sports (15)
2008: Africa Sports (16)
2009: ASEC Mimosas (23)
2010: ASEC Mimosas (24)
2011: Africa Sports (17)
2012: Séwé Sport (1)
2012–13: Séwé Sport (2)
2013–14: Séwé Sport (3)
2014–15: AS Tanda (1)
2015–16: AS Tanda (2)
2016–17: ASEC Mimosas (25)
2017–18: ASEC Mimosas (26)
2018–19: SO de l'Armée (1)
2019–20: Racing Club Abidjan (1)
2020–21: ASEC Mimosas (27)
2021–22: ASEC Mimosas (28)

Total

Topscorers

Records
ASEC Mimosas holds the world record for unbeaten games, playing 108 domestic league and cup matches without defeat between 1989 and 1994.
This streak ended on 19.June 1994 when ASEC lost 1–2 against SO Armée in an Ivorian League fixture.

References

External links
Official Website
Ivoirian Football Federation Profile
Profile at FIFA.com
Profile at MTN
List of seasons at Rec.Sport.Soccer Statistics Foundation
Ligue 1 summary - SOCCERWAY

  
Côte d'Ivoire
1
1960 establishments in Ivory Coast